The Pittsburg State Gorillas football program is a college football team that represents Pittsburg State University in the Mid-America Intercollegiate Athletics Association, a part of the NCAA Division II. The team has had 15 head coaches since its first recorded football game in 1908. The current coach is Brian Wright.

Key

Coaches

See also

 Lists of people from Kansas

Notes

References

Lists of college football head coaches

Kansas sports-related lists